Denis Kelly, Doctor of Divinity (b Wexford 6 July 1864; d Enniscorthy 12 March 1938) was an Irish Roman Catholic Bishop.

Kelly was educated at St Peter's College, Wexford; and the Irish College, Rome. He was ordained priest on 24 April 1889. and appointed a teacher at his old school, rising to be its head. In 1912 he became Parish Priest at Blackwater, County Wexford. He was the Bishop of Ferns from 1917 until his death.

References

Category:Alumni of The Irish College, Rome]]

People from Wexford, County Wexford
1864 births
1938 deaths
20th-century Roman Catholic bishops in Ireland
People educated at St Peter's College, Wexford
Roman Catholic bishops of Ferns